Major General Knut Lennart Peyron (19 November 1909 – 30 December 1981) was a Swedish Air Force officer. His senior commands include commanding officer of the Östgöta Wing (F 3), Chief of the Air Staff and the Third Air Group (E 3).

Career
Peyron was born on 19 November 1909 in Stockholm, Sweden, the son of major general Henry Peyron and his wife Louise (née Reuterskiöld). He became an officer in 1931 when he was commissioned as fänrik in the Swedish Navy. He was promoted to lieutenant in 1936 in the Swedish Air Force, captain in 1940 and major in 1944. Peyron served as chief of staff of the Third Air Group (Tredje flygeskadern, E 3) from 1944 to 1947 when he was promoted to lieutenant colonel. He was then commanding officer of the Flygkadettskolan (F 20) from 1947 to 1951 when he was promoted to colonel and appointed commanding officer of the Östgöta Wing (F 3). In 1952, Peyron was appointed Inspector of Flight Safety (Flygsäkerhetstjänsten) and in 1957 Chief of the Air Staff. In 1957, Peyron was also promoted to major general. He served in this position for three years until he was appointed commanding officer of the Third Air Group in 1960.

Personal life
In 1935, he married Birgit Christianson (born 1911), the daughter of banker Johan Christianson and Helga (née Lundqvist).

Death
Peyron died on 30 December 1981 and was buried at Norra begravningsplatsen in Stockholm on 8 April 1982.

Dates of rank
1931 – Acting sub-lieutenant (Swedish Navy)
1936 – Lieutenant
1940 – Captain
1944 – Major
1947 – Lieutenant colonel
1951 – Colonel
1957 – Major general

Awards and decorations
   Commander Grand Cross of the Order of the Sword (17 November 1969)
   Commander 1st Class of the Order of the Sword (6 June 1957)
   Knight of the Order of the Polar Star
   Knight of the Order of Vasa

Honours
Member of the Royal Swedish Academy of War Sciences (1953)

Filmography
Första divisionen (1941) - air force officer

References

External links

1909 births
1981 deaths
Swedish Air Force major generals
Military personnel from Stockholm
Commanders Grand Cross of the Order of the Sword
Knights of the Order of the Polar Star
Knights of the Order of Vasa
Members of the Royal Swedish Academy of War Sciences
Burials at Norra begravningsplatsen